Paracolpodes is a genus of ground beetles in the family Carabidae. This genus has a single species, Paracolpodes mauritiensis. It is found in Mauritius.

References

Platyninae